ESPZEN is the amateur football association organisation founded in 2004. The organisation is based in Singapore and is well known to have organised amateur football leagues in the country. The organisations have football leagues for open category, veteran category and juniors category. Apart from an 11-a-side social and amateutfootball, ESPZEN have also organised a well structured and highly competitive and recognised 5-a-side football league and 7-a-side football league whereby currently their 7-a-side football league is the biggest and most competitive 7-a-side football tournament in Singapore. ESPZEN was founded by Lee Taylor, an English banker residing in Singapore and the organisation is affiliated to Football Association of Singapore.

ESPZEN Sunday League

ESPZEN Sunday League was founded in 2004. The league is the top amateur football league in Singapore whereby in Season 15 the league have over 13 divisions of amateur football team in Singapore. Together with the amateur side Cosmoleague, it makes up the most competitive amateur football league in Singapore. The very first ESPZEN Sunday League game commenced on 23 May 2004 in the morning between amateur clubs MATADOR Football Club and Killer Whales Football Club with the Killer Whales securing a 1–0 victory over MATADOR. ESPZEN Sunday League make history when the first match on The Float @ Marina Bay was played by the league's team TGA and the Vietnamese side VNNTU in November 2008. Some of the all time well known amateur football clubs competing in the Sunday League are Purple Monkey FC, SCC Tigers, St Davids FC of Wales, Aioli Gaulois FC and FC PROTEGE ESPZEN. The games are usually play on Sunday at 3.00pm. Although ESPZEN Sunday League is not part of the football pyramid of football league organised by the Football Association of Singapore, it will be from level 5 - level 7 of the system if it has to be defined further. This is because the standard played at this league is a top amateur standard league whereby many ex professional and semi-professional players around the world join as they are residing in Singapore.

ESPZEN Saturday League

ESPZEN Midweek League

ESPZEN 7-a-side Midweek League

References

 Interview: Lee Taylor, director of Singapore amateur football league ESPZEN
 ABOUT ESPZEN
 Want a game of five-a-side football? There are more than 20 venues to choose from

Football competitions in Singapore